Magnolia sect. Talauma is a section of the genus Magnolia in the family Magnoliaceae. It was formerly treated as the separate genus Talauma. It contains only New World species, and is native to Mexico, Panama, Brazil, and the West Indies.

Taxonomy
In 1879, Antoine de Jussieu created the genus Talauma for the species Magnolia plumieri (now a synonym of Magnolia dodecapetala). In 1866, Henri Baillon reduced the genus to a section of Magnolia, M. sect. Talauma. The taxon has also been treated as a subgenus and as a subsection of Magnolia. It contains about 96 species.

Some former Talauma species

 Talauma amazonica Ducke → Magnolia amazonica
 Talauma boliviana M.Nee → Magnolia boliviana
 Talauma caricifragrans Loz.-Contr. → Magnolia caricifragrans
 Talauma cespedesii Triana & Planch. → Magnolia cespedesii
 Talauma dixonii Little → Magnolia dixonii
 Talauma espinalii Loz.-Contr. → Magnolia espinalii
 Talauma georgii Loz.-Contr. → Magnolia georgii
 Talauma gilbertoi Loz.-Contr. → Magnolia gilbertoi

 Talauma gloriensis  Pittier → Magnolia gloriensis
 Talauma henaoi Loz.-Contr. → Magnolia henaoi
 Talauma hernandezii → Magnolia hernandezii, molinillo o copachí

 Talauma katiorum Loz.-Contr. → Magnolia katiorum
 Talauma mexicana (DC.) G.Don. → Magnolia mexicana
 Talauma minor Urb. → Magnolia minor
 Talauma narinensis Loz.-Contr. → Magnolia narinensis
 Talauma neillii Lozano → Magnolia neillii

 Talauma polyhypsophylla Loz.-Contr. → Magnolia polyhypsophylla
 Talauma rimachii Loz.-Contr. → Magnolia rimachii
 Talauma sambuensis Pittier → Magnolia sambuensis
 Talauma santanderiana Loz.-Contr. → Magnolia santanderiana

 Talauma virolinensis Loz.-Contr. → Magnolia virolinensis
 Talauma wolfii Loz.-Contr. → Magnolia wolfii

References

Talauma
Magnoliales genera
Taxonomy articles created by Polbot